Dunedin River is a river in the province of British Columbia in Canada.

The  traunviertel. area around Dunedin River has less than two inhabitants per square kilometer. 

The area is part of the boreal climate zones. annual average temperature is-2 °C. The warmest month is July, when the average temperature is 16 °C, and the coldest is January, with-20 °C.

References

Rivers of British Columbia